{{Album ratings
| rev1 = Allmusic
| rev1Score =  <ref>{{cite web |url= |title=Overview for Psychopathics from Outer Space |publisher=Allmusic |accessdate=2009-12-15}}</ref>
}}Psychopathics from Outer Space is a compilation album featuring Insane Clown Posse, Twiztid, Blaze Ya Dead Homie, Psychopathic Rydas, Ice-T, and Myzery. Released on September 30, 1999 on Joe & Joey Records, the album is a collection of outtakes and unreleased tracks.

Overview

"The Dirt Ball" was featured in the film Heavy Metal 2000. "Slim Anus" is a diss track towards Eminem. "Dead End", featuring a guest appearance by Ice-T, was originally intended for The Amazing Jeckel Brothers.

Many of Twiztid's contributions appeared on the original version of Mostasteless''. The Psychopathic Rydas tracks were omitted from the album when it was issued on iTunes and Amazon MP3 by Psychopathic Records.

Track listing

References

Self-released albums
Split albums
Insane Clown Posse compilation albums
Twiztid compilation albums
2000 compilation albums